It's a Crime may refer to:
It's a Crime (play-by-mail game)
"It's a Crime" (Mario song)
"It's a Crime", a 1999 song by the Magnetic Fields from 69 Love Songs

See also
 It's a Crime, Mr. Collins, a radio program